Avon was an electoral district of the Legislative Assembly in the Australian state of Western Australia from 1911 to 2008. The name of the district was changed to Avon Valley in 1950, but reverted to its original name in 1962.

For most of its history, Avon was a Country Party (now Nationals) seat. However, at the 1974 state election, when it merged with the neighbouring safe Labor seat of Northam, Avon was held by Labor's Ken McIver until 1986, when it was won by the newly reunified Nationals. A boundary redistribution occasioned by electoral reforms in 1987 brought in more rural areas and ensured its continuing safety for the National Party.

Avon was abolished when the number of rural seats was reduced as a result of the one vote one value reforms. Almost all of its area moved into the new seat of Central Wheatbelt.

Geography
At the time of its abolition Avon was a rural electorate covering the eastern side of the Darling Scarp. Its main population centres included Northam, York, Beverley, Brookton, Pingelly, Boddington, Wandering, Popanyinning, Cuballing and Wickepin.

Members

Election results

External links
 
 
 

Former electoral districts of Western Australia
1911 establishments in Australia
2008 disestablishments in Australia
Constituencies disestablished in 2008
Constituencies established in 1911